Analaroa is a large town in the Analamanga Region, Madagascar,  80 km north-east of the capital Antananarivo, in the district of Anjozorobe.

It has a population of 9,282 inhabitants in 2018.

External links
 FANAMBY Conservation in Anjozorobe

Populated places in Analamanga